Concentric Data Systems, Inc. was founded in December 1979 by John J. Henderson and Jonathan Sachs, both having left their jobs as system programmers at Data General Corporation.  Originally, the company undertook a variety of software consulting projects for the Data General line of computers.  In 1981, the company developed a spreadsheet product, CompuCalc, that ran on Data General hardware and was modeled after VisiCalc.

In 1982, Sachs left and joined Mitch Kapor to found Lotus Development Corporation.

Concentric transitioned to a product development company, producing a series of software products for the IBM PC.  The products were a file manager, C.I.P, followed by a report writer for Lotus, 1-2-3 Report Writer, followed by a series of report writers marketed under the name R&R.  The R&R products worked with dBase, FoxBase, FoxPro, and various SQL database products.

In 1995, Concentric Data Systems was acquired by Wall Data Corporation of Kirkland, WA.

In 1999, Liveware Publishing, Inc.  acquired the copyrights and intellectual property of the entire R&R and Arpeggio product line from Wall Data Corporation.  R&R has been continuously updated and sold through the present.

References

External links
Official Website
R&R Report Writer Version 6

Arpeggio
Liveware Publishing

1995 mergers and acquisitions
American companies established in 1979
American companies disestablished in 1995
Computer companies established in 1979
Computer companies disestablished in 1995
Defunct companies based in Massachusetts
Defunct computer companies of the United States
Defunct software companies of the United States
Information technology companies of the United States
Software companies established in 1979
Software companies disestablished in 1995
Technology companies established in 1979
Technology companies disestablished in 1995